Ajaymeru is a Gaupalika in Dadeldhura District in the Sudurpashchim Province of far-western Nepal. Ajaymeru has a population of 7066.The land area is 148.9 km2. It was formed  by merging Samaiji, Ajaymeru, Bhadrapur, Chipur and Dewal Divayapuri VDCs.

See also
Ajaymerukot Palace

References

Rural municipalities in Dadeldhura District
Rural municipalities of Nepal established in 2017